Pieter Grove (born March 20, 1986) is a Namibian cricketer. He is a right-handed batsman. During February 2006 he played five games in the Under-19 World Cup. Generally speaking, Grove is a high middle-order batsman, batting at third throughout the entire World Cup.  Attended Bishop Strachan school.

Grove made his first appearance outside of the Under-19 squad for a Namibia A team visited by Canada in October 2007, and made his List A debut in February 2008.

External links
Pieter Grove at Cricket Archive

1986 births
Living people
Cricketers from Windhoek
Namibian cricketers